This is a bibliography of works on Black theology.

Music 
 Cone, James H. The Spirituals and the Blues, Mary Knoll, NY: Orbis Books, 1991.
 Mapson, J. Wendell, Jr., The Ministry of Music in the Black Church, Valley Forge: Judson Press, 1984
 Walker, Wyatt Tee. Somebody's Calling My Name: Black Sacred Music and Social Change, Valley Forge: Judson Press, 1979.

Practical ministry 
 Aldred, Joe. Praying with Power, London: Continuum, 2000 
 Aldred, Joe. Preaching With Power, London: Cassells, 1998
 Andersson, Efraim Churches at the Grassroots London: Lutterworth Press, 1968
 Andrews, Dale P. Practical Theology for Black Churches, Louisville: John Knox Press, 2002
 Cosby, Kevin W. Get Off Your But! Messages Musings and Ministries to Empower the African American Church, Lithonia, Georgia: Orman Press, 2000.
 Crawford, Evans E. The Hum: Call and Response in African American Preaching. Nashville: Abingdon, 1995.
 Felder, Cain Hope. The African Heritage Study Bible, Nashville, Tenn. The James C. Winston Publishing Company, 1993
 Kellar, Marcel. Timothy, Stir Up Your Gift!, Nashville: MEGA Corporation, 2000.
 Mitchell, Henry H. and Thomas, Emil M. Preaching for Black Self-Esteem, Nashville: Abingdon, 1994.
 Ratliffe, Joe S. & Michael J. Cox, Church Planting in the African American Community, Valley Forge: Judson Press, 2002. 111 pages.
 Reddie, Anthony. Acting in Solidarity Peterborough: DLT, 2005
 Reddie, Anthony. Nobodies to Somebodies: Practical Theology for Education and Liberation, Peterborough: Epworth Press, 2003
 Stewart III, Carlyle Fielding  African American Church Growth Twelve Principles for Prophetic Ministry, Nashville, Abingdon Press, 1994
 Stewart III, Carlyle Fielding, ed.  Growing the African American Church, Nashville, Abingdon Press, 2006
 Stewart III, Carlyle Fielding. "Joy Songs, Trumpet Blasts...Sermons in the African American Preaching Tradition, Lima Ohio, CSS Publishing, 1997
 Dudley, Granae D. and Stewart III, Carlyle Fielding. "Sankofa Celebrations for the African American Church, Cleveland, Ohio, United Church Press,1997
 Taylor, Edward L. comp. The Words of Gardner Taylor, Volume 1: NBC Radio Sermons (1959–1970). Valley Forge: Judson Press, 1999.
 Thomas, Walter S., Spiritual Navigation for the 21st Century: Sermons from Walter Thomas. Valley Forge: Judson Press, 2000.
 Trimiew, Darryl M., Editor. Out of Mighty Waters: Sermons by African American Disciples, St. Louis: Chalice Press, 1994.
 Waters, Kenneth L. Afrocentric Sermons: The Beauty of Blackness in the Bible, Valley Forge: Judson Press, 1993.
 Wimberly, Edward P. Moving From Shame to Self-Worth: Preaching and Pastoral Care, Nashville: Abingdon Press, 1999.
 Wright, Jeremiah A. Africans Who Shaped Our Faith: A Study of Ten Biblical Personalities, Chicago: Urban Ministries, 1995
 Wright, Jr., Jeremiah A. Good News: Sermons of Hope for Today's Families, Valley Forge: Judson, 1995.
 Wright, Jr., Jeremiah A. What Makes You So Strong?: Sermons of Joy and Strength from Jeremiah A. Wright, Jr., Valley Forge: Judson Press, 1993.

Sexuality 
 Douglas, Kelly Brown. Sexuality and the Black Church: A Womanist Perspective, Mary Knoll, NY: Orbis Books.
 Kornegay, Jr., EL. Queering Black Homophobia: Black Theology as a Sexual Discourse of Transformation, London: Continuum.
 Kornegay, Jr., EL. A Queering of Black Theology: James Baldwin's Blues Project and Gospel Prose, New York: Palgrave Press, 2013.

Social issues 
 Billingsley, Andrew. Mighty Like a River: The Black Church and Social Reform, New York: Oxford University Press, 1999.
 Fluker, Walter Earl, The Stones that the Builders Rejected: The Development of Ethical Leadership from the Black Church Tradition, Harrisburg: Trinity Press International, 1998.
 Franklin, Robert M.  Another Day's Journey: Black Churches Confronting the American Crisis, Minneapolis: Fortress Press, 1997.
 Grant, Paul and Patel, Raj (Eds.) A Time to Speak. Birmingham: A joint publication of 'Racial Justice' and the 'Black Theology Working Group''' 1990
 Grant, Paul and Patel, Raj (Eds.) A Time To Act: Kairos 1992 Birmingham: A joint publication of 'Racial Justice' and the 'Black Theology Working Group' 1992
 Harris, Forrest E. Ministry for Social Crisis: Theology and Praxis in the Black Church Tradition, Macon, Georgia: Mercer University Press, 1993
 January, Jerald. A Second Time: Examining the Sin of Racial Division that Remain in the Church Today, Grand Rapids: Zondervan, 1996.
 Kirylo, James D. Paulo Freire: The Man from Recife. New York: Peter Lang, 2011.
 Malone, Walter, Jr. An Operative Faith for Oppressed People, Nashville: National Baptist Publishing Board, 1988.
 Sawyer, Mary R.  Black Ecumenism: Implementing the Demands of Justice, Philadelphia:  Trinity Press International, 1998.

 Sociological and historical studies 
 Andersson, Efraim. Churches at the Grassroots, London: Lutterworth Press, 1968
 Arnold, Bruce Makoto. "Shepherding a Flock of a Different Fleece: A Historical and Social Analysis of the Unique Attributes of the African American Pastoral Caregiver." The Journal of Pastoral Care and Counseling 66, no. 2 (June 2012).
 Cone, James H. and Wilmore, Gayraud S. Black Theology A Documentary History: Vol 1. 1966-1979, New York: Orbis Books, 1992
 Cone, James H. and Wilmore, Gayraud S. Black Theology A Documentary History: Vol 2. 1980- 1992, New York: Orbis Books, 1993
 Ela, Jean-Marc. African Cry, Maryknoll: Orbis Books, 1986
 Frazier, E. Franklin. The Black Church in America, New York: Shocken Books, 1964
 Jagessar, Michael N. and Anthony G. Reddie (eds.) Postcolonial Black British Theology, Peterborough, Epworth: 2007
 Jagessar, Michael N. and Anthony G. Reddie (eds.) Black Theology in Britain: A Reader, London, Equinox: 2007
 Lincoln, C. Eric, The Black Church in the African American Experience, Durham, N.Y.: Duke University Press, 1990
 Paris, Peter J. The Social Teaching of the Black Churches, Philadelphia: Fortress Press, 1985.
 Paris, Peter J. The Spirituality of African Peoples, Minneapolis: Fortress Press, 1995
 Pinn, Anne and Anthony B. Black Church History, Fortress Press, 2002
 Rabateau, Albert. Slave Religion, Oxford University Press, 1978
 Reddie, Richard S., Abolition! The Struggle to Abolish Slavery in the British Colonies, Lion Hudson PLC: Oxford, 2007.
 Reddie, Anthony. Faith, Stories and the Experience of Black Elders, London: Jessica Kingsley, 2001
 Sernett, Milton C. African American Religious History: A Documentary Witness, Duke University Press (2nd ed), 1999, 
 Stewart III, Carlyle Fielding. Soul Survivors An African American Spirituality, Louisville, Ky, Westminster John Knox Press, 1997
 Stewart III, Carlyle Fielding. Black Spirituality and Black Consciousness, Trenton, New Jersey, Africa World Press, 1999
 Terrell, JoAnne Marie. Power in the Blood: The Cross in the African American Experience, New York: Orbis books, 1998
 Wilkinson, John. Church in Black and White, St. Andrews Press, 1994
 Williams, Ethel L. and Clifton F. Brown, Howard University Bibliography of African and Afro American Religious Studies: With Locations in American Libraries, SR Books, 1977, 
 Wilmore, Gayraud. Black Religion and Black Radicalism, New York: Orbis Books, 1973.
 Wilmore, Gayraud and Cone, James H. (Eds.) "Black Theology: A Documentary History, 1966-1979", Maryknoll, New York: Orbis Books, 1979. pp. 350–359

 Theology and philosophy 
 Anyabwile, Thabiti M. and Mark A. Noll. The Decline of African American Theology: From Biblical Faith to Cultural Captivity, Inter-Varsity Press, 2007.
 Bailey, Randall C. and Jacquelyn Grant, editors.  The Recovery of Black Presence:  An Interdisciplinary Exploration, Nashville: Abingdon Press, 1995.
 Bond, Gilbert I. Community, Communitas, and Cosmos: Toward a Phenomenological Interpretation and Theology of Traditional Afro-Christian Worship, New York: University Press of America, 2002
 Bond, Gilbert I., A Phenomenology of Reconciliation: Diasporic Community, Cerole Consciousness, and the Religious Life of Paul, Louisville: Westminster John Knox Press, 2000.
 Bridges, Flora  Wilson.  Resurrection Song: African-American Spirituality (The Bishop Henry McNeal Turner/Sojourner Truth Series in Black Religion, Mary Knoll: Orbis Books, 2000.
 Cone, James H. God of the Oppressed, New York: Seabury Press, 1975
 Cone, James H. For My People: Black Theology and the Black Church, New York: Orbis Books, 1984
 Cone, James H. My Soul Looks Back, New York: Orbis Books, 1986
 Cone, James H.  Black Theology and Black Power (20th Anniversary Edition), New York: Harper San Francisco, 1989
 Cooper-Lewter, Nicholas. Soul Theology: The Heart of American Black Culture, Nashville: Abingdon.
 Douglas, Kelly Brown. The Black Christ (Bishop Henry McNeal Turner/Sojourner Truth Series in Black Religion), New York: Orbis Books, 1994
 Dube, Musa W. And Staley, Jeffrey L. John and Postcolonialism London: Sheffield Academic Press, 2002
 DuBois, W. E. B. The Souls of Black Folk New York: Dover Publications 1994
 Duffield, Ian K. (ed) Urban Christ: Responses to John Vincent, Sheffield: UTU, 1997
 Evans, Jr., James H. We Have Been Believers: An African American Systematic Theology, Minneapolis: Fortress Press, 1992
 Felder, Cain Hope Stony. The Road We Trod: African American Biblical Interpretation, Minneapolis: Fortress Press, 1991
 Gerloff, Roswith I. H. A Plea for British Black Theologies, Frankfurt am Main: Peter Lang, 1992
 Hood, Robert E.  Must God Remain Greek?: Afro-Cultures and God-Talk, Minneapolis: Fortress Press, 1990
 Hood, Robert E. Begrimmed and Black: Christian Traditions on Blacks and Blackness, Minneapolis: Fortress Press, 1994
 Hope, Marjorie and Young, James. The South African Churches in a Revolutionary Situation, Maryknoll: Orbis Books, 1979
 Hopkins, Dwight N. (Ed.) Black Faith and Public Talk: Critical Essays on James H. Cone’s Black Theology and Black Power, New York: Orbis Books, 1999
 Hopkins, Dwight N. Introducing Black Theology of Liberation, New York: Orbis book, 1999
 Hopkins, Dwight N. Down, Up and Over: Slave Religion and Black Theology, Minneapolis: Fortress Press, 2000
 Hopkins, Dwight N. and Cummings, George. Cut Loose Your Stammering Tongue: Black Theology and the Slave Narratives, New York: Orbis Books, 1991
 Jennings, Theodore W. Good News to the Poor, Nashville: Abingdon Press, 1990
 Jones, William R. Is God a White Racist? Boston: Beacon Press, 1998.
 Kalilombe, Patrick A. Doing Theology at the Grassroots, Gweru, Zimbabwe: Mambo Press, 1999.
 Okholm, Dennis L. The Gospel in Black & White: Theological Resources for Racial Reconciliation, InterVarsity Press, 1997.
 Pinn, Anthony B. Why Lord?: Suffering and Evil in Black Theology, New York: Continuum, 1995
 Pinn, Anthony B. Terror and Triumph: The Nature of Black Religion, Minneapolis: Fortress Press, 2003
 Reddie, Anthony. Black Theology in Transatlantic Dialogue, Basingstoke & New York: Palgrave Macmillan, 2006.
 Reddie, Anthony. Dramatizing Theologies, London: Equinox, 2006.
 Reddie, Anthony.  Working Against The Grain: Re-imaging Black Theology in the 21st Century, London: Equinox, 2008.
 Reddie, Anthony. Is God Colour Blind?: Insights from Black Theology for Christian Ministry, London: SPCK, 2009
 Reddie, Anthony. Black Theology, Slavery and Contemporary Christianity, Basingstoke: Ashgate, 2010
 Reddie, Anthony. SCM Core Text: Black Theology, London: SCM press, 2012
 Roberts, J. Deotis. Africentric Christianity: A Theological Appraisal for Ministry, Judson Press, 2000.
 Roberts, J. Deotis. Black Religion, Black Theology, Continuum International, 2003.
 Roberts, J. Deotis. Black Theology in Dialogue, Louisville: Westminster John Knox, 1987.
 Roberts, J. Deotis. Liberation and Reconciliation: A Black Theology (Second Edition), Louisville: Westminster John Knox, 2005.
 Roberts, J. Deotis. The Prophethood of Black Believers: An African-American Political Theology for Ministry, Westminster, John Knox, 1994.
 Roberts, Samuel K. In the Path of Virtue: The African American Moral Tradition, Cleveland: Pilgrim Press, 1999.
 Roberts, Samuel K. African American Christian Ethics, Cleveland: The Pilgrim Press, 2001.
 Sanders, Cheryl J. Empowerment Ethics for a Liberated People, Minneapolis: Augsburg Fortress, 1995.
 Simpson, Drumondo L., The New Blood of Black Liberation Theology, 2010
 Singleton III, Harry H. Black Theology and Ideology, Collgeville, Minnesota: The Liturgical Press, 2002.
 Society for Biblical Literature, Reading The Bible in The Global Village, Cape Town, No.3, Atlanta: Society for Biblical Literature, 2002
 Stewart III, Carlyle Fielding. "God Being and Liberation: A Comparative Analysis of the Theological Ontology and Ethical Methods of James H.Cone and Howard Thurman." Landham, New York, London, University Press of America, 1989 
 West, Cornel. African American Religious Thought: An Anthology, Louisville: Westminster John Knox, 2004.

 Women in ministry 
 Aldred, Joe. Sisters with Power, London: Continuum, 2000
 Collier-Thomas, Bettye. Daughters of Thunder: Black Women Preachers and Their Sermons 1850-1979, San Francisco: Jossey-Bass Publishers, 1998.
 Lightner, Ann Farrar. And Your Daughters Shall Preach: Developing a Female Mentoring Program in the African American Church, St. Louis: Hodale Press, Inc., 1995.
 Reddie, Anthony. Legacy: Anthology in Memory of Jillian Brown Peterborough: Methodist Publishing House, 2000

 Journals 
 Black Theology: An International Journal'', published three times per year.

See also 

 Black Consciousness Movement
 James H. Cone
 W. E. B. Du Bois
 Kairos Document
 Liberation theology
 Desmond Tutu

African-American Christianity
Christianity in Africa
Christian bibliographies